Tom Briggs  (29 July 1919 – 4 March 1991) was an Australian rugby league footballer from the 1940s.

Tom Briggs was a very fine rugby league player from Young, New South Wales. He starred in Rugby League Army teams during World War Two including a match representing NSW against Queensland servicemen held on Bougainville in which he was man of the match. After he returned from the war, Briggs joined the Western Suburbs Magpies in 1946. Tom married in 1946 and moved to the St.George area at the end of the 1947 season.

Tom Briggs had two brilliant seasons at the St. George Dragons in 1948 & 1949, scoring 16 tries from 17 games. Injuries towards the end of the 1949 season curtailed his career.

Tom Briggs died in Sydney on 4 Mar 1991, aged 71.

References

1919 births
1991 deaths
Australian rugby league players
St. George Dragons players
Western Suburbs Magpies players
Australian Army personnel of World War II
Australian Army soldiers
Rugby league players from Young, New South Wales
Rugby league centres